Iwobi is an Igbo name. Notable people with the surname include:

Alex Iwobi (born 1996), Nigerian professional footballer 
Toni Iwobi (born 1955), Nigerian born Italian politician
Uzo Iwobi (born 1969), Nigerian born Welsh academic

Igbo-language surnames